Gallienia is a monotypic genus of flowering plants in the family Rubiaceae. The genus contains only one species, viz. Gallienia sclerophylla, which is endemic to Madagascar.

References

Monotypic Rubiaceae genera